Alejandro Reyes (born 7 August 1996 in Puebla) is a Mexican professional squash player. As of September 2022, he was ranked number 154 in the world.

References

1996 births
Living people
Mexican male squash players